The Masovia Governorate was a governorate of Congress Poland, from 1837 to 1944, with its located in Warsaw.

History 
It was established on 7 March 1937, replacing the Masovian Voivodeship, and existed until 31 December 1844, when it was merged with the Kalisz Governorate, forming the Warsaw Governorate on 1 January 1845.

Notes

References 

Governorates of Congress Poland
States and territories established in 1837
States and territories disestablished in 1844
19th century in Warsaw
History of Masovian Voivodeship